Australian Theatre for Young People (ATYP) is a not-for-profit national youth theatre company located in Woolloomooloo, New South Wales, Australia. It was founded in 1964 by Eleanor Witcombe.

History
The first committee was formed in 1964 and consisted of Alastair Duncan as chairman, Diana Sharpe as secretary, Nigel Lovell as treasurer as well as Ellis Irving, Owen Weingott and Wendy Blacklock.

ATYP's first production was the comedy She Stoops to Conquer - Goldsmith Examined by Oliver Goldsmith, adapted and directed by Owen Weingott.

Location
Since 1997, ATYP was housed at The Wharf, Pier 4/5, but due to construction that started in July 2018, ATYP has temporarily relocated its office to Woolloomooloo.

Their performance spaces are SBW Stable's Theatre, Riverside Theatres, Parramatta and The Joan, Penrith.

Productions
ATYP productions have toured regionally, such as Sugarland, nationally, such as A Town Named War Boy, and internationally, such as Patrice Balbina's Chance Encounter with the End of the World.

 Spring Awakening (2016)
 The Big Dry (2016)
 A Town Named War Boy (2015)
 War Crimes (2015)
 The Trolleys (2015)
 The Voices Project: Bite Me (2014)
 M.Rock (2014)
 Sugarland (2014)
 Grounded (2012)

Alumni

Natasha Bassett
 Rose Byrne
 Rob Carlton
 Toni Collette
Abbie Cornish
Maeve Dermody
Michael Gow
Lally Katz
 Nicole Kidman 
 Beejan Land
 Lenka
 Ben Lewis
 Alyssa McClelland
Brandon McClelland
Phoebe Tonkin
 Jessica Tovey
 Felix Williamson
 Rebel Wilson
 Daniel Wyllie 
 Aden Young

References

External links 
 

Theatre companies in Australia
Theatre in Sydney
Woolloomooloo
1964 establishments in Australia